NDMC Supercomputer (Russian: НЦУО СуперкомпЬютер) is a military supercomputer with a speed of 16 petaflops. It is located in Moscow, Russia. The storage capacity is 236 petabytes. The supercomputer is designed to predict the development of armed conflicts and is able to analyze the situation and draw conclusions based on the information about past military conflicts. The database of the supercomputer contains data on the major armed conflicts of modernity for the efficient analysis of future threats.

See also
 TOP500

References

Supercomputers
Petascale computers